Dude Chilling Park is a sign installation, originally created as a prank, which now has official public art status in Vancouver, British Columbia, Canada. It is located on the southwest corner of Guelph Park at the 2300 block of Brunswick Street in the Mount Pleasant area of the city. It references the park's sculpture "Reclining Figure".

History
In November 2012, the sign was created as a prank by local artist Viktor Briestensky, as a light-hearted reference to "Reclining Figure", a public art piece by Michael Dennis installed in Guelph Park in 1991. Vancouver Park Board staff quickly removed the sign, but local resident Dustin Bromley launched an online petition to reinstall the sign. After more than 1,800 signatures of support, the Parks Board decided to reinstall the sign permanently on February 27, 2014, because it celebrates the unique characteristics of the park and neighbouring community. In September 2014, the installation was stolen but has since been replaced.

Popular culture
International attention for Dude Chilling Park included American late night talk show host Jimmy Kimmel who said "Between Dude Chilling Park and Mayor Ford, I might have to move to Canada." R&B Brewing, a local brewery, created "Dude Chilling Pale Ale" in their year-round line-up as a tribute.

The Vancouver Park Board donated a "Barge Chilling Beach" sign that was installed at Sunset Beach, where a wayward barge had been grounded following the November 2021 floods. The Park Board removed the sign in late January 2022.

References

External links 

Individual signs
Practical jokes
Public art in Vancouver
2012 establishments in British Columbia
Installation art